Perișani is a commune located in Vâlcea County, Muntenia, Romania. It is composed of eight villages: Băiașu, Mlăceni, Perișani, Podeni, Poiana, Pripoare, Spinu and Surdoiu. It also included Bratovești, Cucoiu and Titești villages until 2002, when these were split off to form Titești Commune.

References

Communes in Vâlcea County
Localities in Muntenia